Alexander Hryshko (born April 1980 in Toronto, Ontario) is a Canadian historical photographer, noted for changing his style to fit the subject matter.

His art exhibit in April 2008 in Toronto, Ontario, Canada which featured elderly punk icons entitled Fat Fifty and Punk received many solid reviews. Fat Fifty and Punk is "a charming look at some of the genre's most important and notorious characters...(its) best asset is that it intersperses wilder, "punker" images (i.e. Duane Peters giving the camera a drunken middle finger) with gentler, more "mature" portraits."

Artists photographed in this exhibit include:
 Nick Cave
 Jonathan Richman
 Ian MacKaye – Fugazi
 Chuck D – Public Enemy
 Duane Peters – U.S. Bombs
 Henry Rollins – Black Flag
 Dez Cadena – Black Flag & Redd Kross
 Mickey DeSadist – Forgotten Rebels
 Tom Verlaine – Television
 Leonard Grave Phillips – The Dickies
 Joey Shithead – D.O.A.
 Lorna Doom – The Germs
 John Cale – The Velvet Underground
 Iggy Pop
 David Johansen – New York Dolls
 Marky Ramone – Ramones
 Johnny Rotten – Sex Pistols
 Paul Simonon – The Clash
 Joe Strummer – The Clash

References

1980 births
Artists from Toronto
Canadian people of Ukrainian descent
Canadian photographers
Living people